The 2014–15 Ligat Nashim was the 17th season of women's league football under the Israeli Football Association. League matches began on 25 November 2014 and ended on 26 May 2015.

On 21 May 2015, in the penultimate match of the season, ASA Tel Aviv University secured the title, which is its 6th consecutive title and 7th overall. By winning, ASA Tel Aviv qualified to 2015–16 UEFA Women's Champions League.

For this season, the Israel women's national under-19 football team participated in the league, in order to gain experience and cohesion in preparation for the 2015 UEFA Women's Under-19 Championship.

In the second division, Maccabi Be'er Sheva won the league and was promoted to the top division.

Ligat Nashim Rishona

Regular season
Teams play 16 matches in the regular season.

Regular season results

Championship group
Teams play eight more games, for a total of 24.

Championship group results

Relegation group

Relegation group results

Top scorers

Ligat Nashim Shniya

Format changes
As 5 teams registered to the second division, the participating clubs played a 4 round-robin schedules for a planned total of 16 matches for each club.

League table

Results

Matches 1-10

Matches 11-20

Top scorers

Source:

References

External links
Ligat Nashim Rishona @IFA
Ligat Nashim Shniya @IFA
Season at soccerway.com

Ligat Nashim seasons
1
women
Israel